Enrique Escalante (born August 6, 1984) is a volleyball player from Puerto Rico, who was a member of the Men's National Team that ended up in sixth place at the 2007 FIVB Men's World Cup in Japan. In the same year the middle-blocker won the silver medal at the NORCECA Championship in Anaheim. He won with his team the Bronze medal at the 2010 Pan-American Cup.

Clubs
 Plataneros de Corozal (2006–2010)
 Patriotas de Lares   (2010–2014)
 Mets de Guaynabo (2015-2022)
 Changos de Naranjito (2022-Present)

References

External links
 Profile

1984 births
Living people
Puerto Rican men's volleyball players
Volleyball players at the 2007 Pan American Games
Place of birth missing (living people)
Pan American Games competitors for Puerto Rico